Kim Hyo-yeon (born September 22, 1989), referred to as Hyoyeon or DJ Hyo, is a South Korean singer, dancer, DJ, and television personality. She debuted as a member of the girl group Girls' Generation in August 2007, which went on to become one of the best-selling artists in South Korea and one of the most popular K-pop groups worldwide. She has since participated in other SM Entertainment projects, including Girls' Generation-Oh!GG and Got the Beat. Since 2016, she has also released singles as a solo artist.

Early life 
Hyoyeon was born in Incheon, South Korea on September 22, 1989. She grew up with her parents and her younger brother, Kim Min-gu. Hyoyeon's formal dance training started in elementary school. At her neighborhood's small hip-hop school, she learned hip hop, jazz and Latin dance.  In 1999, she enrolled in Winners Dance School, a famous dance school in South Korea specializing in popping, locking, animation and various other hip-hop styles. At the school she met Miss A's Min, with whom she formed the dance team Little Winners. The duo performed at various showcases and was spotlighted by HipHoper.com in 2004.

Hyoyeon auditioned for SM Entertainment at the age of 11 through the SM 2000 Casting System. Hyoyeon said she auditioned because her mother brought her to the offices of S.M. Entertainment in the hopes of meeting H.O.T. Hyoyeon then danced in an audition show. In 2004, along with Super Junior's Siwon, she was sent to study Chinese in Beijing. She received dance instruction from the Electric Boogaloos and top choreographers such as Kim Hye-rang, Poppin Seen, Kwang Hoo (aka Crazy Monkey), Poppin DS, Kwon Seok-jin (aka Locking Khan) and Black Beat's Shim Jae-won. She also worked with one of Justin Timberlake's choreographers and a few foreign teachers.

Before debuting with Girls' Generation, she worked with a choreographer for Janet Jackson and was BoA's silhouette dancer during a performance at M.net KM Music Festival 2005. In 2007, she teamed up with Jae Won for a dance collaboration to "Anonymous". Hyoyeon was also picked as Korea's No. 1 idol dancer on Star News.

Career

Girls' Generation 

Hyoyeon officially debuted as a member of Girls' Generation, a South Korean girl group formed by SM Entertainment, in August 2007. In July 2007, before the official debut Girls' Generation had their first stage performance on Mnet's School of Rock, where the group performed their first single, "Into the New World". On August 5, 2007, the group officially made their debut on SBS's Inkigayo, where they performed the same song. Girls' Generation subsequently released their self-titled debut studio album in November 2007, which was preceded by the singles "Girls' Generation".

On January 7, 2009 the group released their extended play (EP) Gee, its title track claimed the number-one position on KBS's Music Bank for a record-breaking nine consecutive weeks, becoming the longest-running number-one song on Music Bank until 2012, when Psy's "Gangnam Style" claimed the top spot for ten consecutive weeks. Girls' Generation's second studio album, Oh!, was released in January 2010. In September 2010, Girls' Generation released the Japanese version of "Genie" as their debut single in Japan. After releasing three singles in Japan, their debut eponymous Japanese studio album was released in June 2011. The album was met with tremendous success in Japan, peaking atop the Japanese Oricon Albums Chart and becoming the first album by a foreign girl group to top the Oricon chart. Girls' Generation's third Korean studio album, The Boys, was released in October 2011. The album was released in the United States by Interscope Records, marking Girls' Generation's debut album in the country.

On May 17, 2022 SM Entertainment announced that Girls' Generation will have a full-group comeback for their fifteenth anniversary in August, ending their five-year hiatus, which will include Hyoyeon.

Solo career 

Later in June 2016, Hyoyeon was featured in the song "Up & Down" from fellow Girls' Generation member Taeyeon's second mini-album Why. In December 2016, Hyoyeon released her first solo song since debut titled "Mystery" as another single for SM Station. To accompany her solo release, she performed the song on various Korean music shows. In June 2017, Hyoyeon released her second single "Wannabe", a pop dance song featuring rapper San E.

On April 12, 2018, SM Entertainment announced that Hyoyeon would return with a new single titled "Sober" on April 18, with new stage name Hyo (stylized in all uppercase), under SM's electronic dance music label Scream Records. The new single is a tropical-future house song characterized by electric guitar riffs and hook. It was also revealed that she would also be promoting actively as a DJ in domestic club tours and EDM festivals under her new stage name.

In August 2018, Hyoyeon was announced to be part of Girls' Generation's second sub-unit, Oh!GG, which consists of the five members of the group who remained under SM Entertainment. The group released their debut single, "Lil' Touch", in September. On November 7, 2018, SM Entertainment revealed teaser images with the announcement that Hyoyeon would be releasing her second official track as DJ Hyo with a new single titled "Punk Right Now", which features American DJ 3LAU, on November 13.

On July 20, 2019, Hyoyeon released a new single, "Badster", which is a psychedelic trance song she co-produced and co-wrote; an animated music video was released on the same day. It has Korean and English versions. On July 22, 2020 Hyoyeon released a new single, "Dessert", alongside rappers Loopy and Soyeon. It marked her return to music shows after debuting as a DJ.

On August 9, 2021, Hyoyeon released the single "Second", featuring BIBI. The song debuted at position 17 on Billboard World Digital Songs in the chart issue dated August 21, 2021.

On May 2, 2022, SM Entertainment announced that Hyoyeon would be releasing her first extended play titled Deep on May 16. It includes the lead single of the same name, an original B-side, and several previous singles, in a total of seven tracks.

Television 
On March 7, 2010, Hyoyeon and fellow Girls' Generation members Jessica and Sooyoung played cameo roles in episode 7 of the SBS television mini-series Oh! My Lady, starring Chae Rim and labelmate Choi Siwon. In November 2011, Hyoyeon and fellow Girls' Generation member Sunny became cast members for the second season of Invincible Youth, a South Korean reality television show.

In April 2012, Hyoyeon became a contestant in the second season of Dancing with the Stars, a competitive ballroom dancing television show. Hyoyeon and her partner, Kim Hyung-seok, ended up winning second place.

In January 2013, Hyoyeon made a guest appearance on the television show Blind Test Show 180 Degrees, where she took on the challenge of dancing to various types of club music. In June 2013, Hyoyeon and fellow Girls' Generation member Yuri became coaches for the contestants on Dancing 9, a competitive dancing television show.

On March 14, 2015, Hyoyeon was featured as the rapper in a performance by boyband S on Immortal Songs 2, with which they won with 423 points. In May 2015, she became a cast member of the Korean-Chinese reality television show Star Advent. The show followed 12 Korean and Chinese celebrities tasked with working as office workers in foreign countries and premiered on July 9. In June 2015, Hyoyeon began hosting her own reality television show, Hyoyeon's One Million Likes, broadcast on OnStyle. Before the show was officially announced, an Instagram account was created where Hyoyeon posted pictures and videos with the goal of receiving one million likes from fans. In September 2015, Hyoyeon became a contestant alongside Seo In Young, Mir and Hyejeong, among others, in a television show titled Mash Up, where they competed in DJing.

On February 3, 2016, Hyoyeon was a special MC on the OnStyle television show Get It Beauty. In June 2016, she became a contestant alongside Taemin, Bora and Hoya, among others, in the Mnet television show Hit The Stage, where they collaborate with professional dancers to compete in different genres of dancing under a given theme. In May 2020, Hyoyeon joined the competitive reality show Good Girl.

Others 
In October 2012, Hyoyeon participated in S.M. Entertainment's special dance group Younique. The group released a single titled "Maxstep" as part of the collaboration between S.M. and Hyundai.

In May 2013, Hyoyeon was chosen as an Asian ambassador for the Hong Kong branch of Topshop.On February 12, 2015, Hyoyeon was featured in labelmate Amber's "Shake That Brass" music video, in which she plays a trumpet. On July 1, Hyoyeon became the first Girls' Generation member to publish a book with Hyo Style, in which she shares tips on beauty, fashion and lifestyle. The book contains 142 pages and comes with a DVD. On September 11, 2015, Hyoyeon was featured in rapper Vasco's "Whoa Ha!" music video, where guest stars lip-sync along to the song.

In August 2016, she collaborated with Min and Jo Kwon to form a special group named Triple T and release a single titled "Born to Be Wild", featuring Park Jin-young, as part of S.M. Entertainment's Station music project.

On December 27, 2021, Hyoyeon was revealed as a member of supergroup Got the Beat, alongside Girls' Generation groupmate Taeyeon and other labelmates. The group debuted on January 3, 2022 with single "Step Back".

Discography

Extended plays

Singles

Other appearances

Filmography

Film

Television drama

Television shows

Web shows

Music videos

Concerts

Concert participation
 SM Town Live 2022: SMCU Express at Kwangya (2022)
 SM Town Live 2022: SMCU Express (2022)
 SM Town Live 2023: SMCU Palace at Kwangya (2023)

Awards and nominations

Notes

References

External links

  

1989 births
Living people
Girls' Generation members
English-language singers from South Korea
Japanese-language singers of South Korea
Mandarin-language singers of South Korea
Musicians from Incheon
SM Entertainment artists
South Korean dance musicians
South Korean women pop singers
South Korean female idols
South Korean television personalities
South Korean women in electronic music
South Korean DJs